The 1958 Philadelphia Phillies season was the 76th in franchise history. The Phillies finished the season in last place in the National League. It was the Phillies third losing season in five seasons, and their fourth losing season during the 1950s.

Offseason
 December 11, 1957: Dave Philley was purchased by the Phillies from the Detroit Tigers.

Spring training 
Following their off-season move from Brooklyn to Los Angeles, the Dodgers played their first game as the Los Angeles Dodgers against the Phillies at Miami Stadium in the 1958 spring training opener on March 8, 1958. The Phillies won 7 to 4.

Regular season
With the move of the Brooklyn Dodgers and New York Giants to California prior to the 1958 season, the Phillies became the closest National League club to New York City, and in response, contracted to broadcast 78 games into the New York metropolitan television market to fill the void in National League games on TV in New York. Al Helfer and Rex Barney called the games for New York's WOR-TV. However, due to competition with games at Yankee Stadium, Phillies games were not able to match the audience for Yankee broadcasts, and thus, they stopped broadcasting games in the New York television market in the 1959 season.

On July 22 with the team sporting a 39–44 record General Manager Roy Hamey fired Manager Mayo Smith rehiring Eddie Sawyer, who led the team to the 1950 World Series.

Season standings

Record vs. opponents

Notable transactions
 April 15, 1958: Ramón Conde was acquired by the Phillies from the Kansas City Athletics.
 June 8, 1958: Danny Cater was signed as an amateur free agent by the Phillies.
 June 13, 1958: Joe Lonnett was traded by the Phillies to the Milwaukee Braves for Carl Sawatski.
 July 9, 1958: John Boozer was signed as an amateur free agent by the Phillies.
 July 21, 1958: Dwight Siebler was signed as an amateur free agent by the Phillies.
 August 15, 1958: Ramón Conde was purchased from the Phillies by the Los Angeles Dodgers.
 September 29, 1958: Solly Hemus was traded by the Phillies to the St. Louis Cardinals for Gene Freese.

Game log

|- style="background:#bfb"
| 1 || April 15 || @ Redlegs || 5–4 || Ray Semproch (1–0) || Bill Wight (0–1) || None || 32,849 || 1–0
|- style="background:#fbb"
| 2 || April 18 || Braves || 2–4 || Bob Buhl (1–0) || Jack Sanford (0–1) || Don McMahon (1) || 31,624 || 1–1
|- style="background:#fbb"
| 3 || April 19 || Braves || 0–5 || Warren Spahn (1–0) || Curt Simmons (0–1) || None || 8,579 || 1–2
|- style="background:#bfb"
| 4 || April 20 || Braves || 3–2 || Robin Roberts (1–0) || Bob Rush (0–1) || None || 16,366 || 2–2
|- style="background:#fbb"
| 5 || April 21 || Redlegs || 2–4 (14) || Hal Jeffcoat (1–0) || Jim Hearn (0–1) || Johnny Klippstein (1) || 11,764 || 2–3
|- style="background:#bfb"
| 6 || April 23 || Pirates || 8–1 || Jack Sanford (1–1) || Ron Blackburn (1–1) || None || 7,668 || 3–3
|- style="background:#fbb"
| 7 || April 24 || Pirates || 4–7 || Bob Friend (2–0) || Curt Simmons (0–2) || Roy Face (1) || 7,456 || 3–4
|- style="background:#fbb"
| 8 || April 25 || @ Braves || 0–4 || Bob Rush (1–1) || Robin Roberts (1–1) || None || 15,891 || 3–5
|- style="background:#fbb"
| 9 || April 26 || @ Braves || 2–4 || Bob Buhl (3–0) || Ray Semproch (1–1) || None || 15,391 || 3–6
|- style="background:#bfb"
| 10 || April 27 || @ Braves || 6–2 || Jack Sanford (2–1) || Lew Burdette (1–2) || None || 18,408 || 4–6
|- style="background:#bfb"
| 11 || April 29 || @ Giants || 7–4 || Curt Simmons (1–2) || Ramón Monzant (2–2) || Turk Farrell (1) || 6,801 || 5–6
|- style="background:#fbb"
| 12 || April 30 || @ Giants || 1–10 || Johnny Antonelli (2–1) || Robin Roberts (1–2) || None || 7,886 || 5–7
|-

|- style="background:#bfb"
| 13 || May 1 || @ Giants || 7–0 || Ray Semproch (2–1) || Rubén Gómez (2–1) || None || 6,728 || 6–7
|- style="background:#fbb"
| 14 || May 2 || @ Giants || 2–4 || Mike McCormick (1–0) || Jack Sanford (2–2) || Marv Grissom (2) || 13,486 || 6–8
|- style="background:#bfb"
| 15 || May 3 || @ Giants || 4–2 || Curt Simmons (2–2) || Ramón Monzant (2–3) || Turk Farrell (2) || 13,073 || 7–8
|- style="background:#fbb"
| 16 || May 4 (1) || @ Dodgers || 7–8 || Don Bessent (1–0) || Robin Roberts (1–3) || Ed Roebuck (2) || see 2nd game || 7–9
|- style="background:#fbb"
| 17 || May 4 (2) || @ Dodgers || 2–15 || Danny McDevitt (1–2) || Warren Hacker (0–1) || None || 38,453 || 7–10
|- style="background:#bfb"
| 18 || May 5 || @ Dodgers || 8–3 || Ray Semproch (3–1) || Don Drysdale (0–5) || None || 18,075 || 8–10
|- style="background:#fbb"
| 19 || May 6 || @ Dodgers || 6–7 (14) || Don Drysdale (1–5) || Turk Farrell (0–1) || None || 15,799 || 8–11
|- style="background:#bfb"
| 20 || May 7 || @ Dodgers || 9–3 || Curt Simmons (3–2) || Fred Kipp (1–2) || None || 8,192 || 9–11
|- style="background:#fbb"
| 21 || May 9 || @ Pirates || 0–1 (12) || Ron Kline (3–2) || Robin Roberts (1–4) || None || 21,304 || 9–12
|- style="background:#fbb"
| 22 || May 10 || @ Pirates || 4–14 || Vern Law (4–1) || Ray Semproch (3–2) || None || 11,807 || 9–13
|- style="background:#fbb"
| 23 || May 11 (1) || @ Pirates || 4–10 || Bob Friend (5–1) || Jack Sanford (2–3) || None || see 2nd game || 9–14
|- style="background:#fbb"
| 24 || May 11 (2) || @ Pirates || 0–1 (11) || Bob Porterfield (1–0) || Curt Simmons (3–3) || None || 20,544 || 9–15
|- style="background:#bfb"
| 25 || May 13 || Braves || 5–2 || Robin Roberts (2–4) || Bob Buhl (4–2) || None || 13,906 || 10–15
|- style="background:#fbb"
| 26 || May 14 || Braves || 1–4 || Warren Spahn (6–0) || Ray Semproch (3–3) || None || 13,803 || 10–16
|- style="background:#bbb"
| – || May 15 || Braves || colspan=6 | Postponed (rain); Makeup: August 10 as a traditional double-header
|- style="background:#bfb"
| 27 || May 16 || Pirates || 6–2 || Curt Simmons (4–3) || Bob Porterfield (1–1) || None || 12,401 || 11–16
|- style="background:#bfb"
| 28 || May 17 || Pirates || 4–3 || Robin Roberts (3–4) || Bennie Daniels (0–2) || None || 6,262 || 12–16
|- style="background:#bfb"
| 29 || May 18 (1) || Pirates || 6–4 || Jack Sanford (3–3) || Ron Kline (4–3) || Turk Farrell (3) || see 2nd game || 13–16
|- style="background:#bfb"
| 30 || May 18 (2) || Pirates || 6–2 || Ray Semproch (4–3) || Vern Law (5–2) || None || 19,068 || 14–16
|- style="background:#fbb"
| 31 || May 20 || Cardinals || 0–5 || Lindy McDaniel (3–3) || Curt Simmons (4–4) || None || 14,669 || 14–17
|- style="background:#bfb"
| 32 || May 21 || Cardinals || 1–0 || Robin Roberts (4–4) || Sam Jones (3–4) || None || 16,621 || 15–17
|- style="background:#fbb"
| 33 || May 22 || Cubs || 4–7 || Moe Drabowsky (2–4) || Jack Sanford (3–4) || Don Elston (2) || 5,819 || 15–18
|- style="background:#fbb"
| 34 || May 23 || Cubs || 4–11 || Glen Hobbie (3–4) || Ray Semproch (4–4) || None || 10,664 || 15–19
|- style="background:#bfb"
| 35 || May 24 || Cubs || 5–4 || Turk Farrell (1–1) || Don Elston (5–1) || None || 5,210 || 16–19
|- style="background:#bbb"
| – || May 25 || Dodgers || colspan=6 | Postponed (rain); Makeup: July 27 as a traditional double-header
|- style="background:#fbb"
| 36 || May 26 || Dodgers || 1–2 || Carl Erskine (3–2) || Robin Roberts (4–5) || None || 12,807 || 16–20
|- style="background:#bfb"
| 37 || May 27 || Giants || 5–1 || Jack Sanford (4–4) || Stu Miller (1–1) || None || 15,718 || 17–20
|- style="background:#fbb"
| 38 || May 28 || Giants || 6–7 || Marv Grissom (4–1) || Turk Farrell (1–2) || None || 10,561 || 17–21
|- style="background:#fbb"
| 39 || May 30 || Redlegs || 1–10 || Harvey Haddix (3–3) || Curt Simmons (4–5) || None || 11,129 || 17–22
|- style="background:#bfb"
| 40 || May 31 || Redlegs || 5–4 || Robin Roberts (5–5) || Joe Nuxhall (1–2) || None || 6,641 || 18–22
|-

|- style="background:#fbb"
| 41 || June 1 (1) || Redlegs || 1–2 || Bob Purkey (6–1) || Jack Sanford (4–5) || None || see 2nd game || 18–23
|- style="background:#fbb"
| 42 || June 1 (2) || Redlegs || 11–12 (13) || Joe Nuxhall (2–2) || Turk Farrell (1–3) || None || 20,028 || 18–24
|- style="background:#fbb"
| 43 || June 3 || @ Cubs || 4–12 || Taylor Phillips (4–0) || Curt Simmons (4–6) || None || 5,071 || 18–25
|- style="background:#fbb"
| 44 || June 4 || @ Cubs || 5–11 || Moe Drabowsky (3–5) || Robin Roberts (5–6) || None || 5,289 || 18–26
|- style="background:#bfb"
| 45 || June 5 || @ Cubs || 7–6 || Ray Semproch (5–4) || Don Elston (6–3) || Turk Farrell (4) || 3,046 || 19–26
|- style="background:#fbb"
| 46 || June 6 || @ Cardinals || 1–3 || Sam Jones (4–6) || Seth Morehead (0–1) || None || 17,559 || 19–27
|- style="background:#bfb"
| 47 || June 7 || @ Cardinals || 15–6 || Curt Simmons (5–6) || Lindy McDaniel (3–5) || None || 10,839 || 20–27
|- style="background:#fbb"
| 48 || June 8 (1) || @ Cardinals || 5–6 (10) || Billy Muffett (3–1) || Jack Meyer (0–1) || None || see 2nd game || 20–28
|- style="background:#bfb"
| 49 || June 8 (2) || @ Cardinals || 6–4 (14) || Turk Farrell (2–3) || Lindy McDaniel (3–6) || None || 22,022 || 21–28
|- style="background:#bfb"
| 50 || June 10 || @ Dodgers || 3–2 || Ray Semproch (6–4) || Don Newcombe (0–5) || None || 19,671 || 22–28
|- style="background:#fbb"
| 51 || June 11 || @ Dodgers || 4–7 || Don Drysdale (3–8) || Jim Hearn (0–2) || None || 16,236 || 22–29
|- style="background:#bfb"
| 52 || June 12 || @ Dodgers || 4–3 || Turk Farrell (3–3) || Stan Williams (1–1) || None || 9,899 || 23–29
|- style="background:#fbb"
| 53 || June 13 || @ Giants || 1–6 || Johnny Antonelli (6–4) || Robin Roberts (5–7) || None || 18,068 || 23–30
|- style="background:#bfb"
| 54 || June 14 || @ Giants || 3–2 || Ray Semproch (7–4) || Ramón Monzant (4–6) || None || 16,363 || 24–30
|- style="background:#fbb"
| 55 || June 15 || @ Giants || 1–3 || Al Worthington (5–2) || Curt Simmons (5–7) || None || 22,462 || 24–31
|- style="background:#bfb"
| 56 || June 17 || Dodgers || 9–6 || Jack Sanford (5–5) || Clem Labine (3–2) || Turk Farrell (5) || 16,823 || 25–31
|- style="background:#fbb"
| 57 || June 18 || Dodgers || 0–3 || Stan Williams (2–1) || Robin Roberts (5–8) || None || 11,399 || 25–32
|- style="background:#bfb"
| 58 || June 19 || Dodgers || 9–3 || Ray Semproch (8–4) || Johnny Podres (7–5) || None || 13,506 || 26–32
|- style="background:#bfb"
| 59 || June 20 || Giants || 5–4 || Jim Hearn (1–2) || Rubén Gómez (5–6) || None || 14,877 || 27–32
|- style="background:#bbb"
| – || June 21 || Giants || colspan=6 | Postponed (rain); Makeup: July 24 as a traditional double-header
|- style="background:#fbb"
| 60 || June 22 (1) || Giants || 4–5 (14) || Johnny Antonelli (7–5) || Ray Semproch (8–5) || None || see 2nd game || 27–33
|- style="background:#bfb"
| 61 || June 22 (2) || Giants || 3–2 || Robin Roberts (6–8) || Rubén Gómez (5–7) || None || 30,454 || 28–33
|- style="background:#fbb"
| 62 || June 24 || Cubs || 0–3 || John Briggs (1–0) || Jack Sanford (5–6) || None || 21,656 || 28–34
|- style="background:#bfb"
| 63 || June 25 || Cubs || 5–4 (10) || Turk Farrell (4–3) || Don Elston (6–5) || None || 11,796 || 29–34
|- style="background:#bfb"
| 64 || June 27 || Cardinals || 5–4 (11) || Turk Farrell (5–3) || Billy Muffett (3–2) || None || 24,918 || 30–34
|- style="background:#fbb"
| 65 || June 28 || Cardinals || 1–8 || Sal Maglie (3–1) || Curt Simmons (5–8) || None || 11,010 || 30–35
|- style="background:#bfb"
| 66 || June 29 (1) || Cardinals || 5–4 (13) || Jack Meyer (1–1) || Larry Jackson (5–4) || None || see 2nd game || 31–35
|- style="background:#fbb"
| 67 || June 29 (2) || Cardinals || 3–4 || Vinegar Bend Mizell (6–6) || Jack Sanford (5–7) || Jim Brosnan (1) || 27,554 || 31–36
|-

|- style="background:#bfb"
| 68 || July 1 || @ Pirates || 4–2 || Ray Semproch (9–5) || Bob Friend (9–9) || None || 17,990 || 32–36
|- style="background:#bfb"
| 69 || July 3 || @ Braves || 3–1 || Robin Roberts (7–8) || Carl Willey (2–1) || None || 17,624 || 33–36
|- style="background:#bfb"
| 70 || July 4 (1) || @ Braves || 5–1 || Curt Simmons (6–8) || Bob Rush (6–4) || Turk Farrell (6) || see 2nd game || 34–36
|- style="background:#bfb"
| 71 || July 4 (2) || @ Braves || 4–0 || Jack Sanford (6–7) || Warren Spahn (10–5) || None || 23,706 || 35–36
|- style="background:#bfb"
| 72 || July 5 || @ Redlegs || 8–5 (12) || Turk Farrell (6–3) || Willard Schmidt (2–3) || None || 6,954 || 36–36
|- style="background:#bfb"
| 73 || July 6 (1) || @ Redlegs || 7–1 || Ray Semproch (10–5) || Brooks Lawrence (6–4) || None || see 2nd game || 37–36
|- style="background:#fbb"
| 74 || July 6 (2) || @ Redlegs || 4–11 || Joe Nuxhall (6–4) || Seth Morehead (0–2) || Hal Jeffcoat (8) || 14,851 || 37–37
|- style="background:#bbcaff;"
| – || July 8 ||colspan="7" |1958 Major League Baseball All-Star Game at Memorial Stadium in Baltimore
|- style="background:#bfb"
| 75 || July 10 || @ Cardinals || 13–3 || Robin Roberts (8–8) || Sal Maglie (3–3) || None || 17,619 || 38–37
|- style="background:#fbb"
| 76 || July 11 || @ Cardinals || 2–6 || Sam Jones (6–7) || Jack Sanford (6–8) || None || 16,095 || 38–38
|- style="background:#bfb"
| 77 || July 12 || @ Cubs || 12–2 || Ray Semproch (11–5) || Dick Drott (4–7) || None || 17,114 || 39–38
|- style="background:#fbb"
| 78 || July 13 (1) || @ Cubs || 2–3 || John Briggs (3–0) || Jack Meyer (1–2) || None || see 2nd game || 39–39
|- style="background:#fbb"
| 79 || July 13 (2) || @ Cubs || 1–2 || Dave Hillman (2–0) || Curt Simmons (6–9) || None || 30,415 || 39–40
|- style="background:#fbb"
| 80 || July 14 || @ Cubs || 10–11 (11) || Glen Hobbie (7–6) || Ray Semproch (11–6) || None || 5,610 || 39–41
|- style="background:#fbb"
| 81 || July 15 || @ Giants || 0–1 || Mike McCormick (7–1) || Robin Roberts (8–9) || None || 14,523 || 39–42
|- style="background:#fbb"
| 82 || July 16 || @ Giants || 2–9 || Johnny Antonelli (10–7) || Jack Sanford (6–9) || None || 10,250 || 39–43
|- style="background:#fbb"
| 83 || July 17 || @ Giants || 7–8 || Marv Grissom (6–3) || Turk Farrell (6–4) || None || 10,259 || 39–44
|- style="background:#fbb"
| 84 || July 18 || @ Dodgers || 6–8 || Carl Erskine (4–3) || Jack Sanford (6–10) || Clem Labine (9) || 24,533 || 39–45
|- style="background:#bfb"
| 85 || July 19 || @ Dodgers || 6–2 || Robin Roberts (9–9) || Sandy Koufax (7–4) || None || 30,962 || 40–45
|- style="background:#fbb"
| 86 || July 20 || @ Dodgers || 0–6 || Johnny Podres (10–8) || Curt Simmons (6–10) || None || 17,506 || 40–46
|- style="background:#bbb"
| – || July 22 || Giants || colspan=6 | Postponed (rain, wet grounds); Makeup: September 12 as a traditional double-header
|- style="background:#bfb"
| 87 || July 23 || Giants || 2–0 || Ray Semproch (12–6) || Mike McCormick (7–2) || None || 23,050 || 41–46
|- style="background:#bbb"
| – || July 24 (1) || Giants || colspan=6 | Postponed (rain); Makeup: July 28 as a traditional double-header
|- style="background:#bbb"
| – || July 24 (2) || Giants || colspan=6 | Postponed (rain); Makeup: July 28 as a traditional double-header
|- style="background:#fbb"
| 88 || July 25 || Dodgers || 3–7 || Clem Labine (4–3) || Jim Hearn (1–3) || Fred Kipp (1) || 19,171 || 41–47
|- style="background:#fbb"
| 89 || July 26 || Dodgers || 4–10 || Sandy Koufax (8–4) || Jack Sanford (6–11) || None || 18,117 || 41–48
|- style="background:#bfb"
| 90 || July 27 (1) || Dodgers || 7–4 || Robin Roberts (10–9) || Stan Williams (6–6) || None || see 2nd game || 42–48
|- style="background:#bfb"
| 91 || July 27 (2) || Dodgers || 6–2 (10) || Jim Hearn (2–3) || Fred Kipp (4–5) || None || 17,666 || 43–48
|- style="background:#fbb"
| 92 || July 28 (1) || Giants || 2–3 || Mike McCormick (8–2) || Turk Farrell (6–5) || None || see 2nd game || 43–49
|- style="background:#fbb"
| 93 || July 28 (2) || Giants || 1–2 || Rubén Gómez (6–7) || Jack Meyer (1–3) || None || 29,805 || 43–50
|- style="background:#bfb"
| 94 || July 29 || Cardinals || 3–2 (11) || Bob Miller (1–0) || Phil Paine (4–1) || None || 20,894 || 44–50
|- style="background:#bfb"
| 95 || July 30 || Cardinals || 5–1 || Jack Sanford (7–11) || Billy Muffett (3–3) || Turk Farrell (7) || 14,706 || 45–50
|- style="background:#bfb"
| 96 || July 31 || Cardinals || 4–3 || Jim Hearn (3–3) || Larry Jackson (7–9) || Turk Farrell (8) || 16,695 || 46–50
|-

|- style="background:#bfb"
| 97 || August 1 || Cubs || 3–1 || Robin Roberts (11–9) || Dave Hillman (2–3) || None || 16,258 || 47–50
|- style="background:#fbb"
| 98 || August 2 || Cubs || 5–6 || Bill Henry (4–1) || Bob Miller (1–1) || Don Elston (6) || 8,821 || 47–51
|- style="background:#bfb"
| 99 || August 3 (1) || Cubs || 8–2 || Ray Semproch (13–6) || Taylor Phillips (6–6) || None || see 2nd game || 48–51
|- style="background:#fbb"
| 100 || August 3 (2) || Cubs || 10–12 || Marcelino Solis (2–1) || Jack Meyer (1–4) || Bill Henry (5) || 16,211 || 48–52
|- style="background:#fbb"
| 101 || August 5 || @ Redlegs || 5–6 || Joe Nuxhall (9–7) || Turk Farrell (6–6) || None || 9,107 || 48–53
|- style="background:#bfb"
| 102 || August 6 || @ Redlegs || 8–5 || Robin Roberts (12–9) || Harvey Haddix (7–6) || Turk Farrell (9) || 8,646 || 49–53
|- style="background:#bfb"
| 103 || August 7 || @ Redlegs || 3–2 || Don Cardwell (1–0) || Bob Purkey (13–7) || None || 7,341 || 50–53
|- style="background:#bfb"
| 104 || August 8 || Braves || 7–6 || Turk Farrell (7–6) || Don McMahon (6–2) || None || 25,842 || 51–53
|- style="background:#bfb"
| 105 || August 9 || Braves || 5–4 || Jim Hearn (4–3) || Lew Burdette (11–9) || None || 24,943 || 52–53
|- style="background:#fbb"
| 106 || August 10 (1) || Braves || 7–8 || Humberto Robinson (2–3) || Jack Meyer (1–5) || None || see 2nd game || 52–54
|- style="background:#fbb"
| 107 || August 10 (2) || Braves || 3–14 || Carl Willey (7–3) || Robin Roberts (12–10) || Juan Pizarro (1) || 32,117 || 52–55
|- style="background:#bfb"
| 108 || August 11 || Redlegs || 5–4 (10) || Don Cardwell (2–0) || Willard Schmidt (2–5) || None || 14,247 || 53–55
|- style="background:#fbb"
| 109 || August 12 || Redlegs || 4–12 || Tom Acker (1–2) || Ray Semproch (13–7) || None || 12,926 || 53–56
|- style="background:#fbb"
| 110 || August 13 || Pirates || 9–10 || Bob Smith (1–2) || Jack Meyer (1–6) || Vern Law (2) || 19,132 || 53–57
|- style="background:#fbb"
| 111 || August 15 || @ Braves || 0–1 || Carl Willey (8–3) || Robin Roberts (12–11) || None || 35,552 || 53–58
|- style="background:#fbb"
| 112 || August 16 || @ Braves || 1–2 || Warren Spahn (16–8) || Curt Simmons (6–11) || None || 31,869 || 53–59
|- style="background:#fbb"
| 113 || August 17 (1) || @ Braves || 1–5 || Juan Pizarro (4–1) || Don Cardwell (2–1) || None || see 2nd game || 53–60
|- style="background:#fbb"
| 114 || August 17 (2) || @ Braves || 1–4 || Lew Burdette (13–9) || Ray Semproch (13–8) || None || 39,807 || 53–61
|- style="background:#fbb"
| 115 || August 19 || @ Cardinals || 4–5 || Bill Wight (3–1) || Turk Farrell (7–7) || None || 17,851 || 53–62
|- style="background:#bfb"
| 116 || August 20 || @ Cardinals || 12–2 || Robin Roberts (13–11) || Billy Muffett (4–5) || None || 11,928 || 54–62
|- style="background:#fbb"
| 117 || August 21 || @ Cardinals || 1–2 || Larry Jackson (10–10) || Curt Simmons (6–12) || None || 10,314 || 54–63
|- style="background:#fbb"
| 118 || August 22 || @ Cardinals || 1–9 || Sam Jones (11–9) || Don Cardwell (2–2) || None || 15,592 || 54–64
|- style="background:#bfb"
| 119 || August 23 || @ Cardinals || 4–2 || Seth Morehead (1–2) || Sal Maglie (3–7) || Turk Farrell (10) || 14,639 || 55–64
|- style="background:#bfb"
| 120 || August 24 (1) || @ Cubs || 13–8 || Jim Hearn (5–3) || Bill Henry (4–3) || Jack Meyer (1) || see 2nd game || 56–64
|- style="background:#bfb"
| 121 || August 24 (2) || @ Cubs || 5–3 (8) || Jack Sanford (8–11) || Dave Hillman (3–6) || Curt Simmons (1) || 24,572 || 57–64
|- style="background:#bfb"
| 122 || August 26 || @ Cubs || 10–3 || Robin Roberts (14–11) || Moe Drabowsky (9–11) || None || 9,967 || 58–64
|- style="background:#fbb"
| 123 || August 27 || @ Cubs || 2–5 || Bob Anderson (1–0) || Curt Simmons (6–13) || None || 9,451 || 58–65
|- style="background:#fbb"
| 124 || August 29 || @ Redlegs || 3–5 || Bob Purkey (15–8) || Don Cardwell (2–3) || None || 10,283 || 58–66
|- style="background:#fbb"
| 125 || August 30 || @ Redlegs || 3–12 || Tom Acker (3–2) || Seth Morehead (1–3) || Brooks Lawrence (3) || 5,083 || 58–67
|- style="background:#fbb"
| 126 || August 31 (1) || @ Redlegs || 2–6 || Harvey Haddix (8–7) || Ray Semproch (13–9) || None || see 2nd game || 58–68
|- style="background:#fbb"
| 127 || August 31 (2) || @ Redlegs || 3–7 || Don Newcombe (5–11) || Robin Roberts (14–12) || None || 13,290 || 58–69
|-

|- style="background:#fbb"
| 128 || September 1 (1) || @ Pirates || 2–5 || Vern Law (11–11) || Jack Sanford (8–12) || None || see 2nd game || 58–70
|- style="background:#bfb"
| 129 || September 1 (2) || @ Pirates || 9–0 || Curt Simmons (7–13) || Bob Porterfield (3–6) || None || 25,438 || 59–70
|- style="background:#fbb"
| 130 || September 2 || @ Pirates || 2–3 || Bob Friend (19–13) || Don Cardwell (2–4) || None || 9,911 || 59–71
|- style="background:#fbb"
| 131 || September 3 || Braves || 5–11 || Warren Spahn (18–10) || Seth Morehead (1–4) || None || 14,829 || 59–72
|- style="background:#fbb"
| 132 || September 4 || Braves || 5–9 (10) || Juan Pizarro (5–2) || Turk Farrell (7–8) || None || 14,989 || 59–73
|- style="background:#fbb"
| 133 || September 5 || Redlegs || 4–8 || Don Newcombe (6–11) || Robin Roberts (14–13) || Brooks Lawrence (4) || 10,530 || 59–74
|- style="background:#fbb"
| 134 || September 6 || Redlegs || 2–10 || Bob Purkey (16–9) || Curt Simmons (7–14) || None || 5,559 || 59–75
|- style="background:#fbb"
| 135 || September 7 (1) || Redlegs || 4–6 || Hal Jeffcoat (6–8) || Turk Farrell (7–9) || None || see 2nd game || 59–76
|- style="background:#fbb"
| 136 || September 7 (2) || Redlegs || 2–9 || Joe Nuxhall (12–10) || Seth Morehead (1–5) || Orlando Peña (2) || 12,081 || 59–77
|- style="background:#bfb"
| 137 || September 9 || Dodgers || 4–3 || Jack Sanford (9–12) || Sandy Koufax (10–10) || Jack Meyer (2) || 8,359 || 60–77
|- style="background:#bfb"
| 138 || September 10 || Dodgers || 8–6 || Robin Roberts (15–13) || Don Drysdale (11–13) || Don Erickson (1) || 5,106 || 61–77
|- style="background:#bfb"
| 139 || September 11 || Dodgers || 4–3 || Turk Farrell (8–9) || Johnny Podres (13–13) || None || 4,382 || 62–77
|- style="background:#fbb"
| 140 || September 12 (1) || Giants || 2–5 || Rubén Gómez (9–12) || Don Cardwell (2–5) || Al Worthington (4) || see 2nd game || 62–78
|- style="background:#fbb"
| 141 || September 12 (2) || Giants || 2–19 || Johnny Antonelli (15–12) || Ray Semproch (13–10) || None || 16,560 || 62–79
|- style="background:#fbb"
| 142 || September 13 || Giants || 5–6 || Gordon Jones (3–1) || Seth Morehead (1–6) || Don Johnson (1) || 6,502 || 62–80
|- style="background:#fbb"
| 143 || September 14 || Cardinals || 3–6 || Sam Jones (13–11) || Jack Sanford (9–13) || Jim Brosnan (4) || 7,802 || 62–81
|- style="background:#bfb"
| 144 || September 15 || Cardinals || 6–2 || Robin Roberts (16–13) || Vinegar Bend Mizell (10–13) || None || 5,988 || 63–81
|- style="background:#fbb"
| 145 || September 16 || Cubs || 8–10 (10) || John Buzhardt (1–0) || Don Erickson (0–1) || Dave Hillman (1) || 4,300 || 63–82
|- style="background:#fbb"
| 146 || September 17 || Cubs || 2–6 (7) || Bob Anderson (3–1) || Ray Semproch (13–11) || None || 2,845 || 63–83
|- style="background:#fbb"
| 147 || September 19 || Pirates || 2–4 || Bob Friend (22–13) || Don Cardwell (2–6) || None || 8,498 || 63–84
|- style="background:#fbb"
| 148 || September 20 || Pirates || 3–4 || Vern Law (14–11) || Robin Roberts (16–14) || Bob Smith (2) || 4,217 || 63–85
|- style="background:#bbb"
| – || September 21 (1) || Pirates || colspan=6 | Postponed (rain); Makeup: September 22 as a traditional double-header
|- style="background:#bbb"
| – || September 21 (2) || Pirates || colspan=6 | Postponed (rain); Makeup: September 22 as a traditional double-header
|- style="background:#bfb"
| 149 || September 22 (1) || Pirates || 3–2 (14) || Jack Meyer (2–6) || Ron Kline (13–16) || None || see 2nd game || 64–85
|- style="background:#bfb"
| 150 || September 22 (2) || Pirates || 1–0 || Jack Sanford (10–13) || Bennie Daniels (0–3) || None || 5,605 || 65–85
|- style="background:#bfb"
| 151 || September 23 || @ Braves || 6–5 || Jim Owens (1–0) || Juan Pizarro (6–4) || Turk Farrell (11) || 18,639 || 66–85
|- style="background:#bfb"
| 152 || September 26 || @ Pirates || 3–2 || Robin Roberts (17–14) || Bob Friend (22–14) || None || 12,000 || 67–85
|- style="background:#bfb"
| 153 || September 27 || @ Pirates || 7–3 || Don Cardwell (3–6) || Vern Law (14–12) || None || 9,104 || 68–85
|- style="background:#bfb"
| 154 || September 28 || @ Pirates || 6–4 (10) || Jack Meyer (3–6) || Don Gross (5–7) || None || 33,109 || 69–85
|-

| style="text-align:left;" |
The second game on June 1 was suspended (Sunday curfew) in the top of the ninth inning with the score 11–11 and was completed August 11, 1958.
The second game on June 22 was suspended (Sunday curfew) in the bottom of the sixth inning with the score 0–1 and was completed July 23, 1958. (The initial completion date of July 22 was postponed by rain.)
The second game on June 29 was suspended (Sunday curfew) in the bottom of the eighth inning with the score 3–4 and was completed July 29, 1958.
The second game on July 27 was suspended (Sunday curfew) in the bottom of the sixth inning with the score 2–1 and was completed September 9, 1958.

Roster

Player stats

Batting

Starters by position 
Note: Pos = Position; G = Games played; AB = At bats; H = Hits; Avg. = Batting average; HR = Home runs; RBI = Runs batted in

Other batters 
Note: G = Games played; AB = At bats; H = Hits; Avg. = Batting average; HR = Home runs; RBI = Runs batted in

Pitching

Starting pitchers 
Note: G = Games pitched; IP = Innings pitched; W = Wins; L = Losses; ERA = Earned run average; SO = Strikeouts

Other pitchers 
Note: G = Games pitched; IP = Innings pitched; W = Wins; L = Losses; ERA = Earned run average; SO = Strikeouts

Relief pitchers 
Note: G = Games pitched; W = Wins; L = Losses; SV = Saves; ERA = Earned run average; SO = Strikeouts

Awards and honors
All-Star Game
Richie Ashburn, starter, outfield
Turk Farrell, reserve

Farm system

LEAGUE CHAMPIONS: Johnson City

References

External links
1958 Philadelphia Phillies season at Baseball Reference

Philadelphia Phillies seasons
Philadelphia Phillies season
Philadelphia